FMW 11th Anniversary Show: Backdraft was a professional wrestling pay-per-view (PPV) event produced by Frontier Martial-Arts Wrestling (FMW). The event took place on May 5, 2000 at Komazawa Gymnasium in Tokyo, Japan. The event commemorated the eleventh anniversary of FMW.

In the main event, Hayabusa defeated ECW Japan member Masato Tanaka. Another important match on the card featured Tetsuhiro Kuroda defend the WEW World Heavyweight Championship against Kodo Fuyuki, with Fuyuki defeating Kuroda to win the title. Originally, the main event was planned to be Mr. Gannosuke and H against Masato Tanaka and The Gladiator, as part of the ECW-FMW talent exchange. However, The Gladiator (who was also the ECW World Heavyweight Champion) left ECW for WCW in April 2000 due to Paul Heyman owing him money, which killed off the relationship between ECW and FMW.

Reception
Stuart of Puroresu Central felt that the 11th Anniversary Show "didn't live up to the hype and anticipation it had. A couple of very good matches and a perfectly watchable one didn't make it too bad but much of the undercard stuff was dreadful. Fuyuki's booking has dragged the FMW product down so far."

Results

References

External links

2000 in professional wrestling
FMW Anniversary Show
Events in Tokyo
2000 in Tokyo
May 2000 events in Japan
Professional wrestling in Tokyo